The Strip is a 1951 American crime film noir directed by László Kardos and starring Mickey Rooney, Sally Forrest and William Demarest. Much of the picture was shot on location in and around the Sunset Strip. Interiors were shot at the popular nightclubs Mocambo and Ciro's and at the restaurants Little Hungary and Stripps.  A large part of the film's running time consists of musical performances by the "house band," which includes Louis Armstrong, Jack Teagarden, and Earl "Father" Hines (all playing themselves). and by performers at other clubs, such as Vic Damone.

Plot
A voiceover narrator briefly describes the Sunset Strip, its clubs, and its unusual status as an unincorporated area, patrolled by the county sheriff's office. Police officers are seen going to an apartment building where someone has been killed.  Soon after, detectives come to the apartment of Stanley Maxton (Mickey Rooney) to bring him to headquarters for questioning.  At the police station, Stanley begins to tell his story.

Having been hospitalized following duty in the Korean War, Stanley goes to Los Angeles with the hope of making enough money to open his own club. On the way, he is given a ride by Sonny Johnson (James Craig), who turns out to be involved in gambling rackets.  Sonny hires Stanley to work for his bookmaking operation, but Stanley still has plans of his own. At one club, "Fluff's," Stanley persuades the owner (William Demarest) to let him sit in on the drums with the house band, which includes Louis Armstrong, Jack Teagarden, and Earl "Father" Hines (all playing themselves).  Fluff offers to hire Stanley, but he refuses because he is well-paid by Johnson.  However, Stanley is strongly interested in the club's cigarette girl, Jane Tafford (Sally Forrest), who has her own ambitions.

Although Stanley and Jane go out together, she is clearly not interested in his plans to marry her and settle down.  When she meets Sonny Johnson, the gangster suggests that he can help her get hired by a movie studio.  Eventually, the two begin to date.  Stanley comes to realize this and grows increasingly jealous, following the two to other nightclubs and places around the city.  After Sonny has some of his thugs beat up Stanley, he is confronted in his apartment and killed by an unseen assailant.

Back in the present at the station, Stanley learns that Jane is in the hospital in serious condition and that she is suspected of the murder.  Stanley, trying to protect Jane, writes out a full confession but is shown by the chief detective that he could not have been the murderer.  It turns out that Jane had gone to Sonny's place to confront him and, in a struggle with a gun, was shot, along with Sonny.  Jane has written a deathbed confession of her own just before dying.  Stanley is released.  At Fluff's, the owner advises him to seek outlets for his desperation, and in the end he winds up back on the drums performing with the band.

Cast
 Mickey Rooney as Stanley Maxton
 Sally Forrest as Jane Tafford
 William Demarest as Fluff
 James Craig as Delwyn 'Sonny' Johnson
 Kay Brown as Edna
 Louis Armstrong as himself
 Tommy Rettig as Artie Ardrey
 Tom Powers as Detective Lt. Bonnabel
 Jonathan Cott as Behr
 Tommy Farrell as Boynton
 Myrna Dell as Paulette Ardrey
 Jacqueline Fontaine as Frieda
 Vic Damone as himself
 Monica Lewis as herself

Production notes
The film is set against the backdrop of Hollywood's Sunset Strip, with Louis Armstrong, Earl Hines and Jack Teagarden appearing as themselves in the film. Pete Rugolo, who is credited with Leo Arnaud with the film's orchestrations, was a well-known jazz arranger.

Much of the picture was shot on location in and around the Sunset Strip. Interiors were shot at the popular nightclubs Mocambo and Ciro's and at the restaurants Little Hungary and Stripps.

Reception
According to MGM records, the film made $656,000 in the US and Canada and $326,000 elsewhere, resulting in a loss of $284,000.

Critical response
Film critic Dennis Schwartz discussed the production in his review and praised the work of Mickey Rooney, "A minor mystery story that's given some high gloss in its production by the MGM studio system, as Louis "Satchmo" Armstrong and his distinguished band made up of Jack Teagarden, Earl "Fatha" Hines, and Barney Bigard serenade us with a few numbers and there are various other jazz pieces included from singers Monica Lewis and Vic Damone. It's set on the intriguing Sunset Strip where Mickey Rooney plays the sincere little guy, Stanley Maxton, a jazz drummer who is accused of murder ... The breezy story line, the snappy jazz interludes, and some engaging scenes made it very appealing ... Rooney is super as the perennial victim who only finds his soul when he's lost in his music. The film effectively captured the existential mood and the glee derived from the club scene on the Strip. It's an above-average mystery story that could be categorized as film noir because of Rooney's pained expression as a victim of love."

Accolades
The song "A Kiss to Build a Dream On" was nominated for an Academy Award for Best Song. "In the Cool, Cool, Cool of the Evening," from the Paramount film Here Comes the Groom won the award.

The film is recognized by American Film Institute in these lists:
 2004: AFI's 100 Years...100 Songs:	
 "A Kiss to Build a Dream On" – Nominated

References

External links
 
 
 
 
 

1951 films
1951 crime drama films
American black-and-white films
American crime drama films
Film noir
Films about music and musicians
Films produced by Joe Pasternak
Films set in Los Angeles
Metro-Goldwyn-Mayer films
1950s English-language films
Films directed by László Kardos
1950s American films